Fred Thomas (born August 6, 1976) is an American indie rock musician who was described by Mark Deming of AllMusic as "[o]ne of the most influential figures on Michigan's indie rock scene". Thomas founded the math rock band Chore in 1994. After this band broke up in 1996, he joined His Name Is Alive in addition to serving as a member of Lovesick and Flashpapr. He founded the band Saturday Looks Good to Me in 1999, and it released four studio albums before going on hiatus in 2008. He has also released music as a solo artist, beginning with the 2002 album Everything Is Pretty Much Totally Fucked Up. His most recent solo studio album is Aftering, which was released in 2018 and featured Anna Burch and Elliot Bergman. Since then, Fred has moved on to a new guitar rock project, Idle Ray, while continuing to release albums of instrumental electronic music under his own name.

Discography

Albums
Everything Is Pretty Much Totally Fucked Up (Little Hands, 2002)
I Heard the Angels Sing (Ypsilanti, 2003)
Turn It Down (Polyvinyl, 2004)
Sink Like a Symphony (Corleone, 2006)
Flood (Magic Marker, 2007)
Old News (Ypsilanti, 2008)
 Night Times (self-released, 2010)
Kuma (Ernest Jenning, 2012)
All Are Saved (Polyvinyl, 2015)
Changer (Polyvinyl, 2017)
Aftering (Polyvinyl, 2018)
Dream Erosion (Life Like, 2020)
Those Dreams Are Dust, Dream Erosion Pt. II (Dagoretti, 2022)

Compilation
Another Song About Riding The Bus - Selected Songs 2002 - 2020 (Antiquated Future, 2020)

EPs 
 Fred Thomas (CDr, Ypsilanti, 2001)
 Tour EP (CDr, Ypsilanti, 2002)
 Birdsong (with Juan Garcia, CDr, Ypsilanti, 2005)
 Up North (Split cassette release with Troy Graham, Van Party Tapes, 2014)

Singles

Timeline of music projects

References

External links

Living people
1976 births
People from Ypsilanti, Michigan
American indie rock musicians
Musicians from Michigan
Polyvinyl Record Co. artists